Edward Maples (1840 – 8 June 1878) was a New Zealand cricketer. He played in six first-class matches for Canterbury from 1868 to 1874.

See also
 List of Canterbury representative cricketers

References

External links
 

1840 births
1878 deaths
New Zealand cricketers
Canterbury cricketers
Cricketers from Liverpool